|}

The Imperial Call Chase is a Grade 3 National Hunt steeplechase in Ireland which is open to horses aged five years or older. 
It is run at Cork over a distance of 3 miles (4,828 metres), and it is scheduled to take place each year in late March or early April. The race is named in honour of Imperial Call, the winner of the Hennessy Gold Cup and Cheltenham Gold Cup in 1996, who was trained in County Cork.

The race was first run in 2000, and was awarded Grade 3 status in 2012. The 2017 running was named the Dr Vincent O'Brien Centenary Chase to commemorate the centenary of the birth of Vincent O'Brien in April 1917. O'Brien came from Churchtown, County Cork and was president of Cork Racecourse from 1997 to his death in 1997. Since 2019 the race has been run under sponsored titles.

Records
Most successful jockey (2 wins):
 Barry Cash – Lyreen Wonder (2000), Wellforth (2012)
 Barry Geraghty– Joueur D'Estruval (2004), Slim Pickings (2006)
 Robbie Power – 	G V A Ireland (2005), Roberto Goldback (2011)

Most successful trainer (4 wins): 
 Willie Mullins – Joueur D'Estruval (2004), Our Ben (2007), On His Own (2015), Melon (2022)

Winners

See also
 List of Irish National Hunt races

References

Racing Post:

National Hunt races in Ireland
National Hunt chases
Cork Racecourse